Siren Song: Understanding Pakistan Through its Women Singers is a book by English scholar Fawzia Afzal-Khan. It explores the history of female singers in Pakistan through a lens of feminist theory. It was published by Oxford University Press on August 25, 2020.

Overview 
The book follows the history of Pakistan, beginning with the Partition of India in 1947. It is in the context of this history that the book explores the political and social significance of music and women's roles in Pakistani society.

References 

Oxford University Press books
History books about Pakistan
Women in Pakistan
Feminism in Pakistan